The Bishop's Block, also known as the Bishop's Block Apartments, is an historic building located in Dubuque, Iowa, United States. It was individually listed on the National Register of Historic Places in 1994. It was included as a contributing property in the Old Main Street Historic District in 2015.

History
The building significance is derived from its association with its architect, Franklin D. Hyde. He was a Dubuque architect known for his residential designs. Considered his best work, Hyde designed the building in the Romanesque Revival style. It was completed in 1887 and the exterior is composed of brick. At one time the building had a distinctive turret on its northwest corner.

The building was commissioned by John Hennessy, the third bishop of the Catholic Diocese of Dubuque, and derives its name from him. He was involved in speculative real estate and business ventures in the Dubuque area, and he built or  acquired numerous buildings around the city. This building was first occupied by wholesale grocer Marshall M. Walker. After five years, the John T. Hancock Company was housed here. The Western Grocery Company occupied the building from 1908 into the 1950s. It has subsequently been renovated into apartments.

References

Industrial buildings completed in 1887
Romanesque Revival architecture in Iowa
Apartment buildings in Dubuque, Iowa
National Register of Historic Places in Dubuque, Iowa
Industrial buildings and structures on the National Register of Historic Places in Iowa
Individually listed contributing properties to historic districts on the National Register in Iowa